Klaus Jäger (born 6 February 1950) is a German former rower. He competed in the men's coxed pair event at the 1976 Summer Olympics.

References

External links
 

1950 births
Living people
German male rowers
Olympic rowers of West Germany
Rowers at the 1976 Summer Olympics
People from Kelheim
Sportspeople from Lower Bavaria
World Rowing Championships medalists for Germany